The Independence State Hospital was built in 1873 as the second asylum in the state of Iowa. It is located in Independence, Iowa. The original plan for patients was to relieve crowding from the hospital at Mount Pleasant and to hold alcoholics, geriatrics, drug addicts, mentally ill, and the criminally insane. It was built under the Kirkbride Plan. The hospital's many names include: The Independence Lunatic Asylum, The Independence State Asylum, The Independence Asylum for the Insane, The Iowa State Hospital for the Insane, and The Independence Mental Health Institute. There is also a labyrinth of tunnels which connect every building. Like most asylums of its time, it has had a gruesome and dark history. Remnants of this are the graveyard, hydrotherapy tubs, and lobotomy equipment.

History and present state
Overcrowding was quickly becoming a problem at the Mount Pleasant State Hospital. Realizing that the need for another asylum in the state of Iowa was growing at a surprising rate, the state commission quickly rallied for another hospital to be built at the city of Independence, Iowa.  The architect was Stephen Vaughn Shipman who also designed the mental institution in Elgin, Illinois; Anna, Illinois; Oshkosh, Wisconsin and Mendota, Wisconsin. Like the Clarinda State Hospital, and the Cherokee State Hospital, changes have been made to the building, but the building looks much like it did in early photographs and postcards. The Independence State Hospital is now known as The Independence Mental Health Institute. It continues to serve as a psychiatric hospital with a drug and alcohol rehabilitation program as well as a training school for nurses. Although some areas of the Kirkbride are now unused, the building has been kept in good shape and has recently undergone some renovations. There is a museum in the hospital which contains relics from its older years. Tours of the institution are open to the public by appointment.

References

External links
Photos and information
Aerial photos
Independence State Hospital
History and visiting information

Hospital buildings completed in 1873
Hospitals established in 1873
Psychiatric hospitals in Iowa
Kirkbride Plan hospitals
Buildings and structures in Buchanan County, Iowa
Medical museums in the United States
Museums in Buchanan County, Iowa
Independence, Iowa